"Bow Wow (That's My Name)" is the second single from Lil' Bow Wow's debut album Beware of Dog. It features fellow rapper Snoop Dogg.

Song info
It samples "Dernier Domicile Connu" originally recorded by François de Roubaix and "Atomic Dog" by George Clinton.

Formats and track listings
Maxi CD single
 Bow Wow (That's My Name) (Track Masters Remix)
 Bow Wow (That's My Name) (Going Back To Cali Remix)
 Bow Wow (That's My Name) (Radio Edit)
 Bow Wow (That's My Name) (Instrumental)

The "radio edit" completely removes Snoop Dogg's rap and instead, includes a new verse. It also removes Lil' Bow Wow's mention of Snoop Dogg and Jermaine Dupri's line as well, making it a song by Lil' Bow Wow only. All versions censor profanities, including the second half of "motherfucker" in Snoop's verse, leading listeners to only hear "woof mother...the Dogg came to play".

Music video
The video was shot of Los Angeles directed by Dave Meyers. It was voted for the #1 video on BET's 106 & Park. It was the first music video on 106 & Park to be retired.
2001 : Won Billboard Music Award
Category Rap Single of the Year for "Bow Wow (That's My Name)"
2001 : Won BET Award
Category Viewer's Choice for "Bow Wow (That's My Name)"
Bow Wow features in the video along with his alleged "Godfather" Snoop Dogg, Fred Durst, Chanté Moore, Moby, and his 'mentor' Jermaine Dupri.

The beginning of the music video, in which students sit in a classroom during detention, is referenced in the music video of Ava Max's 2019 song "So Am I".

Charts

Weekly charts

Year-end charts

Certifications

References 

2000 singles
2000 songs
Bow Wow (rapper) songs
Snoop Dogg songs
Songs written by Jermaine Dupri
Songs written by Bryan-Michael Cox
Songs written by Snoop Dogg
Music videos directed by Dave Meyers (director)
Song recordings produced by Jermaine Dupri
Songs written by George Clinton (funk musician)
Songs written by Garry Shider